Super Champ is a weekly Muay Thai program that broadcasts live on Thai television in Bangkok. Unlike weekly traditional Muay Thai programs, Super Champ features three-round Muay Thai fights. In 2023, the program changed its name to LWC Super Champ and its venue to Lumpinee Boxing Stadium.

History

Muay Thai Super Champ 
The Super Champ was formed in Bangkok in 2018 after the separation of the Channel 8 TV coverage team from Max Muay Thai. Super Champ fight cards exclusively consist of three-round fights in order to encourage fighters start quickly and constantly be active, in addition to present a television-friendly format of Muay Thai. There are usually 7 fights per week in which foreign fighters face Thai fighters. This event is held under traditional Muay Thai rules with 12 oz gloves, unlike Muay Hardcore, which is contested with 4 oz gloves. Super Champ fights are three rounds in duration and attendance is free. Unlike Muay Hardcore, fighters perform the wai khru ram muay and all fights in Super Champ are accompanied by traditional music. Venum is the equipment sponsor of the Super Champ, as well as for the ring.

LWC Super Champ
In mid-January of 2023, Super Champ was rebranded as LWC Super Champ (Lumpinee World Championship Super Champ). The program also changed its location to the Lumpinee Boxing Stadium. Furthermore, LWC Super Champ featured a mix both three-round and five-round Muay Thai fights.

Live broadcaster 
Super Champ broadcasts are aired live on Sunday nights at 7:00 p.m. on Channel 8. The events during the COVID-19 epidemic are performed in accordance with hygienic principles at The Bazaar Hotel in Chatuchak District.

While Channel 8 is still the television broadcaster for LWC Super Champ, the airing time has been switched to 6:00 p.m. on Saturday nights.

See also 

 Sports broadcasting contracts in Thailand
 Channel 8 (Thailand)
 Muay Hardcore

References

External links 
 Super Champ on Channel 8 Thailand
 

Professional Muay Thai organizations
2018 establishments in Thailand
Chatuchak district